Terrängbil m/42 KP (tgb m/42 KP), meaning "terrain car m/42 KP" (KP standing for Karosseri Pansar, "Coachwork Armour"), colloquially known as "KP-car", was an early Swedish infantry fighting vehicle developed during World War II. It is at its core a flatbed truck with 4 wheel drive for off-road driving, fitted with an armoured body elongated over and around the bed with a troop transport compartment behind the cabin for a panzergrenadier squad of 16.

Due to the wheeled chassis and machine gun armament, the tgb m/42 KP is often called an armoured personnel carrier. This is terminologically incorrect, as the vehicle was purpose built as a first generation infantry fighting vehicle, intended to carry a designated panzergrenadier squad not just into and out of battle, but also during battle as a protected firing position (so called mounted combat), with the ability to off-load troops into its vicinity depending on the situation (so called dismounted combat) — see the Panzergrenadier-article for more information on the this doctrine.

Two base variants existed based on the chassis: a Scania-chassis-based variant, designated the "tgb m/42 SKP" (Scania KP), and a Volvo-chassis-based variant, designated the "tgb m/42 VKP" (Volvo KP).

Technical description

Body 
For disembarking and boarding, the troop compartment had an armored hatch on each lower side of the vehicle, right in front of the rear axle wheels.

The troop compartment originally lacked a fixed roof and had partially open sides meant for the infantry to shoot from as part of its infantry fighting vehicle role. Instead of a fixed roof, the back end of the body had full height sides so a tarpaulin could be fitted over the troop compartment between the cabin and the back. In 1983, however, most remaining vehicles were updated with a new fully enclosed troop compartment with firing ports and a back door for fast disembarkment.

Armament 
While always intended for fixed armament, featuring a round hatch sized hole on the cabin roof, the vehicles initially lacked any permanent such and the cabin roof hole was often bolted over with a metal plate. Instead the vehicles were outfitted with storage for the weaponry, munition and equipment of the panzergrenadiers, such as machine guns, hand grenades and man-portable anti-tank systems, etc. One vehicle was early on at one point trialed with a 20 mm akan m/40 autocannon, but the first standard fixed armament was a single ksp m/39 machine gun fitted in a rotating turret ring on top of the cabin sometime during the second half of the 1940s. This machine gun could fire either the 8×63mm m/32 machine gun cartridge or the 6.5×55mm m/94 rifle cartridge depending on the barrel fitted.

In 1956 the existing vehicles received new armament in the form of twin ksp m/36 lv dbl (luftvärn dubbel) anti-aircraft machine guns in a rotating ring-mount on the cabin roof. These could also fire the 8 mm m/32 and 6.5 mm m/94 rounds depending on the barrel (post 1972 also the 7.62×51mm NATO cartridge). During the 1983 REMO-upgrade the ksp m/36 twin-mount was replaced with two 7.62 mm ksp m/58B light machine guns in single mounts, one on the cabin roof and one at the back of the new troop compartment roof. The new enclosed compartment also featured three portholes on each side of the vehicle for use as firing ports with assault rifles and the like.

History

Development 

In 1941, when tanks were organised into a unit of their own, it was clear there was a desperate need for a troop carrier able to both keep up with the tanks and provide protection against artillery shrapnel and small-arms fire. Due to the war, there were no international suppliers to buy from, so the only option was to develop a domestic solution. AB Landsverk designed an IFV consisting of a chassis from a regular army lorry equipped with an armoured coachwork. The prototype had many similarities to the German Sd.Kfz. 251 IFV, featuring a similarly shaped cabin front and a troop door at the back. The cabin front was altered and the back door removed on the service models.

After prototyping, production was set up based on two types of truck chassis, a Volvo chassis and a Scania-Vabis chassis. The armour-plates were made by Bofors, Landsverk, Bröderna Hedlund and Karlstads Mekaniska Werkstad and then delivered to Volvo or Scania-Vabis for final assembly on their chassis'. The Volvo versions, Tgb m/42 VKP had a fixed winch on the right side for towing the vehicle forward, while the Scania-Vabis, SKP, instead had a windlass on the left side which allowed towing both forwards and backwards. The first approved delivery was made in 1944, after some 38 vehicles had been failed due to tensions caused by welding the hardened steel. This was rectified by switching to a soft-hardened steel and then heating the completed body-work in purpose-built ovens to remove the tensions.

During the 1950s the vehicles were modified with a ring-mounting for a double machine gun on the cab roof and at that time the designations changed to Tgb m/42 VKPF and SKPF (F = Fordonsluftvärn, or vehicular anti-aircraft).

In 1983, many surviving SKPFs of the Swedish Army were modified with armoured roofs and in many other ways, resulting in several new versions.

International use 

The SKPF saw combat with Swedish UN forces during the Congo Crisis in the 1961–1964 period, while the VKPF was kept for domestic use. 15 SKPFs were also bought by the UN and used by the Indian and Irish battalions in Congo. After a number of KP gunners in Congo were shot in the waist, armour plating to cover the gap between the roof and the machine gun ring was added in sito.

A few left-behind UN SKPFs were reconditioned and used by the Congolese Army in 1964-65.

SKPFs were also deployed by United Nations Peacekeeping Force in Cyprus during the intercommunal violence in 1964, some being donated to the UN forces there.

After the collapse of the Soviet Union, Estonia, Latvia and Lithuania received 10 SKPF each for a total of 30, some being modified to mount a 12.7 mm DShKM heavy machine gun over the cabin.

Variants 

SKP (Scania Karosseri Pansar) – Scania produced 300 total.
Terrängbil m/42 SKP (tgb m/42 SKP) – 1944 config, open roof, unarmed/armed with a single-mount 8 mm ksp m/39 machine gun on the cabin.
Terrängbil m/42 SKPF (tgb m/42 SKPF) – 1956 config, open roof, armed with twin-mount 8 mm ksp m/36 lv dbl anti-aircraft machine guns on the cabin (F-suffix = Fordonsluftvärn; vehicular anti-aircraft),  less load capacity.

VKP (Volvo Karosseri Pansar) – Volvo produced 200 total.
Terrängbil m/42 VKP (tgb m/42 VKP) – 1944 config, open roof, unarmed/armed with a single-mount 8 mm ksp m/39 machine gun on the cabin.
Terrängbil m/42 VKPF (tgb m/42 VKPF) – 1956 config, open roof, armed with twin-mount 8 mm ksp m/36 lv dbl anti-aircraft machine guns on the cabin (F-suffix = Fordonsluftvärn; vehicular anti-aircraft),  less load capacity.

REMO – 1983 
REMO = Renovation, Modifikation: 223 total (Scania KP only).
Terrängbil m/42 D SKPF (tgb m/42 D SKPF) – closed roof with firing ports and back door, armed with two single-mount 7,62 mm ksp 58B light machine guns on the front and back end of the roof, six smoke grenade dischargers, spaced external front armour removed due to weight, new terrain wheels (wheelhouse reworked), servo brakes and new street legal lighting, 173 modified.
Stabterrängbil m/42 A SKP (stabtgb m/42 A SKP) – Equal to the terrängbil m/42 D SKPF but intended as a command vehicle with internally integrated radios: three Ra 421, one Ra 195, + electronics, 16 modified.
Sjukterrängbil 9521 A (sjtgb 9521 A) – military ambulance version of the terrängbil m/42 D SKPF, unarmed, 23 modified.
Terrängbil m/42 E SKPF (tgb m/42 E SKPF) – coup defense version of the terrängbil m/42 D SKPF, one ksp 58B light machine gun in original m/36 twin-mount, 11 modified.

Footnotes

References

Notes

Web sources

Printed sources

See also 

List of modern armoured fighting vehicles
Swedish Armed Forces

Armoured fighting vehicles of Sweden
Armoured personnel carriers of Sweden
Infantry fighting vehicles of the Cold War
Military vehicles introduced from 1940 to 1944
Armoured personnel carriers of WWII
Wheeled armoured personnel carriers